Flight 650 may refer to:

Ozark Air Lines Flight 650, crashed on 20 December 1983
Northwest Flight 650, pilots drunk on 8 March 1990

0650